Words and Music contains 10 songs from 1981's Glen Campbell Live and combines them with the only CD release thus far of the 1965 Country Shindig compilation album.

Track listing
 "Rhinestone Cowboy" (Larry Weiss) - 3:15
 "Gentle on My Mind" (John Hartford) - 2:06
 "By The Time I Get To Phoenix" (Jimmy Webb) - 2:45
 "Dreams of the Everyday Housewife" (Chris Gantry) - 2:12
 "It's Only Make Believe" (Conway Twitty, Jack Nance) - 2:39
 "Crying" (Roy Orbison, Joe Melson) - 3:35
 "Southern Nights" (Allen Toussaint) - 3:59
 "Try A Little Kindness" (Sapaugh, Austin) - 2:36
 "Medley" - 4:29
 "Wichita Lineman" (Jimmy Webb)
 "Galveston" (Jimmy Webb)
 "Country Boy (You Got Your Feet In LA)" (Dennis Lambert, Brian Potter)
 "Please Come To Boston" (Dave Loggins) - 3:42
 "Greenfields" (Gilkyson, Dehr, Miller) - 2:20
 "The Man With The Golden Gun" (John Barry) - 2:25
 "Cherry Beat" (Bond) - 2:35
 "Gospel Harp" (Russell) - 2:07
 "Shindig Hoot" (Glen Campbell) - 2:17
 "Greenback Dollar" (Axton, Ramsey) - 2:00
 "If I Had a Hammer" (Trad. arr. by Lee Hays, Pete Seeger) - 2:50
 "Walk Right In" (Cannon. Woods) - 2:17
 "Cotton Fields" (Ledbetter) - 2:30
 "Country Shindig" (Edmonson) - 2:30

2006 compilation albums
Glen Campbell compilation albums